Lucrezia Francesca Pandora Butt (formerly Virpi Sanna Sinikka Butt; August 9 1972 – November 22 2021) was a Finnish murderer. She first became known as Timantti in the 1993-94 season of Gladiaattorit.

Killings in Pirkkala
Virpi Butt was sentenced in Tampere District Court and Turku Court of Appeal to life imprisonment for the so-called dismemberment of Pirkkala on Midsummer 2003. The victim was 26-year-old Arto Malinen.

Death of Kari Anttonen and cannibalism
During the investigation of Arto Malinen's death, the perpetrator of which was Janne Hyvönen (born 1974), the murder of Kari Anttonen on May 29, 2002 came to light. At that time, the victim was 29-year-old programmer Kari Pekka Anttonen, and the weapon was a bladed weapon.  Anttonen and Butt had been dating for some time before the murder. Anttonen had spent the evening with Butt and Hyvönen at the restaurant Sputnik and ended up at Butt's apartment at the end of the evening. Early in the morning, Hyvönen stabbed Anttonen in the back and sawed his head off. Butt picked up his head. Butt and Hyvönen dragged Anttonen's body into the bathroom and cleaned the apartment. The killing took place at Butt's home, and two of her minor children were present. A two-year-old boy slept in the same room where Anttonen was killed. The 16-year-old boy was sleeping in a walk-in wardrobe, but at some point he went to see what was happening in the room and also saw the body.

Hyvönen told the court that he cut off Anttonen's legs and put them in the oven with spices and salt. He ate Anttonen's meat, but Butt did not participate in cannibalism. However, Butt had tried to offer Anttonen's meat as "chops" to her acquaintance. The rest of the dismembered body was packed in cardboard boxes and put on the balcony because they started to smell. In the morning, Hyvönen's friend had used his car to move cardboard boxes to trash cans in different parts of Tampere. Butt and Hyvönen had wanted to take part of the body to Nokia, but the driver did not agree to this.

After the murder, Butt had presented Anttonen's head to other people. As a motive for presenting the severed head, Butt told the court that she presented the head because she wanted the crime to be revealed to the police. Hyvönen had finally put Anttonen's head in a pot to fry and watched how the expression on his face became distorted. In court, Hyvönen described his act: "I just watched when it changed its expression. It started smiling. I was sitting in the kitchen myself, drinking liquor and laughing." According to Butt, Hyvönen had removed Anttonen's teeth by beating them with a knife, which Hyvönen denied in court.

Killing and dismemberment of Arto Malinen
On Midsummer's Eve of 2003, Janne Hyvönen stayed to take care of Butt's three-year-old child while she was getting alcoholic beverages for Midsummer. On her way, Butt had run into Arto Malinen. They had been drinking at a bar until the it closed and took a taxi to Malinen's apartment. The next day, Malinen and Butt continued drinking at a bar. However, they were thrown out of it. They tried to sell drugs on the street, and Butt suggested moving to Pirkkala to Malinen's place, which they did. A young man who came to buy drugs lost his temper when there were no promised drugs at Malinen's apartment, and a dispute arose. The argument ended with Butt stabbing Malinen ten times in the back with a kitchen knife. Butt called Hyvönen, and they dismembered Malinen's body and robbed the victim. A woman who was in the party told the court that Butt had threatened to kill her as well, which Butt denied.

Butt told the court that she first stripped Malinen naked. After this, they sawed off Malinen's head. They say that they put his organs in a bag, in the toilet and a bucket. As a justification for this, she said that she wanted to prevent the internal organs from smelling. Hyvönen had cut off the victim's fingertips, fearing that the victim would be identified by fingerprints. The perpetrators tried to run over Malinen's head in the yard with a car, but the attempt failed, because the head always slipped to the side.

Criminal investigation and trial
At first, the emergency center did not believe that a dismemberment had occurred and dismissed the first call as a joke.
After the investigation began, Anttonen's body was searched for in Nokia's Koukkujärvi landfill, but it was not found. Malinen's body was found in Nokia. 
Hyvönen came to the trial for a couple of days wearing the clothes of the murdered victim. The perpetrators requested and were granted access to mental state examinations. In the studies, it was found that both were mentally fully capable. The court ordered Hyvönen and Butt to pay over 100,000 euros in compensation to the families of the victims.

Life after prison
The Helsinki Court of Appeal accepted Butt's parole request in August 2017 and set her release date as December 31, 2018, when she has been in prison for about 15.5 years. According to the overall forensic psychiatric assessment, Butt had a high risk of committing a violent crime again, so the Criminal Sanctions Institute and the Psychiatric Prison Hospital were against her release. However, the Court of Appeal considered that, among other things, Butt's close relationship with her family and having an apartment make it easier to return to civilian life. The Court of Appeal considered that there was a positive development in Butt's situation.  The same Court of Appeal accepted Hyvönen's parole application in August 2018 and set the release date as March 1, 2019.

After her release, Virpi Butt changed her name to Lucrezia Francesca Pandora Butt, moved to Kuru, a small town in western Finland and started working in a nationally operating company.

She got married in the last years of her life. Butt's spouse filed for divorce in June 2021. The divorce did not take effect, as Butt died about six months later in November 2021. According to Ilta-Sanomat, she was staying abroad before her death. Her cause of death remains undisclosed.

She remains the only suspect in the case of the disappearance and death of basketball player Raisa Räisänen in Tampere in 1999.

References 

Murder in Finland
Finnish female murderers
2000s murders in Finland
Incidents of cannibalism

1972 births
2021 deaths